John Butkiewicz (born 9 November 1951) is an Australian field lacrosse player who was named the best midfielder at both the 1978 and 1982 World Lacrosse Championships (WLC). Butkiewicz represented Australia at a record five WLC's, from 1974 to 1990, and is in the Sport Australia Hall of Fame.

Butkiewicz popularized the lacrosse face-off "clamp" that is widely used today.

References

External links
 
 
 

1951 births
Living people
Australian lacrosse players
Sport Australia Hall of Fame inductees
Sportsmen from Victoria (Australia)